The Environmental Impact Assessment Directive 2011 (2011/92/EU) is an EU directive relevant for European environmental law.

Contents
Article 6 requires that planning authorities be consulted, and the "public shall be informed, whether by public notices or by other appropriate means such as electronic media where available" of the following:

Significance
The EIAD 2011 was the subject of litigation in the UK constitutional law case of R (HS2 Action Alliance Ltd) v Secretary of State for Transport.

See also
UK enterprise law
Oil and gas in the UK

Notes

United Kingdom enterprise law